Mervyn Herbert (Merv) Thackeray (20 October 1925 – 7 June 2014) was an Australian politician. He was a Labor Party member of the Legislative Assembly of Queensland from 1957 until 1972, representing Keppel (1957–1960) and Rockhampton North (1960–1972). He was disendorsed in January 1972 and ran unsuccessfully as an independent at the 1972 state election.

Thackeray was born in Mackay and educated at Mackay Primary School. He had a career as a grazier and on the railways before entering politics, working variously as engine driver, fireman, engine cleaner and union delegate. He entered politics at the 1957 election immediately following the Labor split of that year, defeating Labor defector and Queensland Labor Party candidate Viv Cooper on behalf of official Labor in the seat of Keppel. His seat of Keppel was abolished in 1960, and he successfully switched to its successor seat of Rockhampton North. He was subsequently re-elected in Rockhampton North a further three times.

Thackeray had a poor relationship with the party administration throughout the later part of his career. Mike Ahern claimed Thackeray had been "on the outer with the ALP, partly because he was a left-wing meat worker and partly because he was useless." Ahern further claimed that Thackeray had been leaking Labor tactics to Government Whip Vince Jones.
In January 1972, Thackeray, along with two other dissident MLAs, Col Bennett and Ed Casey, were disendorsed after repeated clashes with the state secretary and state executive. The three MLAs ran for re-election as independents under the banner of the "True Labor Party", but Thackeray and Bennett were both soundly defeated.

References

1925 births
2014 deaths
Independent members of the Parliament of Queensland
Members of the Queensland Legislative Assembly
Australian Labor Party members of the Parliament of Queensland